Biuncaria kenteana is a species of moth of the family Tortricidae. It is found in China (Heilongjiang), Mongolia and Russia (the South Siberian Mountains).

References

Moths described in 1892
Eucosmini